Silodor may refer to:
Sidney Silodor, American bridge player
Silodor Open Pairs, bridge competition named in his honor